Nushagak may refer to:

 Nushagak, Alaska
 Nushagak River
 Nushagak Peninsula
 Nushagak Bay
 Nushagak (star)